The 2017–18 TFF First League is the 17th season since the league was established in 2001 and 55th season of the second-level football league of Turkey since its establishment in 1963–64.

Teams 
Rizespor, Gaziantepspor and Adanaspor relegated from 2016–17 Süper Lig.
Sivasspor, Yeni Malatyaspor and Göztepe promoted to 2017–18 Süper Lig.
İstanbulspor, Erzurum BB and Ankaragücü promoted from 2016–17 TFF Second League.
Şanlıurfaspor, Bandırmaspor and Mersin İdmanyurdu relegated to 2017–18 TFF Second League.

Stadia and locations

League table

Results

Promotion playoffs

Semifinals

Final

See also 
 2017–18 Turkish Cup
 2017–18 Süper Lig

References

External links 
  Turkish Football Federation PTT 1. League

TFF First League seasons
Turkey
2017–18 in Turkish football